Devon County Cricket Club was established on 26 November 1899. It has since played minor counties cricket from 1901 and played List A cricket from 1969 to 2005, using a different number of home grounds during that time. Their first home minor counties fixture in 1901 was against Wiltshire at Gras Lawn, Exeter, while their first home List A match came 77 years later against Staffordshire in the 1978 Gillette Cup at the Recreation Ground, Torquay.

The twenty grounds that Devon have used for home matches since 1901 are listed below, with statistics complete through to the end of the 2014 season.

Grounds

Locations within Devon

List A
Below is a complete list of grounds used by Devon County Cricket Club when it was permitted to play List A matches. These grounds have also held Minor Counties Championship and MCCA Knockout Trophy matches.

Minor Counties
Below is a complete list of grounds used by Devon County Cricket Club in Minor Counties Championship and MCCA Knockout Trophy matches.

Notes

References

Devon County Cricket Club
Cricket grounds in Devon
Devon